The  Washington Redskins season was the franchise's 33rd season in the National Football League (NFL) and their 28th in Washington, D.C. The team improved on their 3–11 record from 1963 and finished 6–8.

Regular season

Schedule

Season summary

Week 1: vs. Cleveland Browns

Week 5

    
    
    
    
    
    
    
    

The first meeting between the two teams since they traded quarterbacks in the offseason.

Week 9: at Cleveland Browns

Standings

Roster

References

Washington
Washington Redskins seasons
Washington Redskins